Eg or EG may refer to:

In arts and media
 E.G. (EP), an EP by Goodshirt
 EG (magazine), a journal dedicated to chess endgame studies
 Eg White (born 1966), a British musician, songwriter and producer
 E.G. Records, a music record label
 Electric Gardens, a music festival in Faversham, UK
 My Little Pony: Equestria Girls, an American toy line and media franchise by Hasbro

Businesses and organizations
 Enskilda Gymnasiet, a private secondary school in Stockholm, Sweden
 Eurographics, European Association for Computer Graphics
 Evil Geniuses, an electronic sports team
 Japan Asia Airways (IATA code EG)

Places
 Egypt, a country in Northern Africa
Eg, Afghanistan, a town
 Eg (Kristiansand), a neighbourhood in Kristiansand, Norway
 Eg River, a river in northern Mongolia
 Equatorial Guinea, a small African country

In science and technology
 .eg, Internet country code top-level domain for Egypt
 Envelope generator, used in synthesizers
 Ethylene glycol, an alcohol
 Exagram (Eg), an SI unit of mass
 Band gap energy, an energy range in a solid in which no electron states can exist

Other uses
 Evangelisches Gesangbuch, hymnal of many German language Protestant congregations
 EG, a model code for the 5th generation Honda Civic
 eingetragene Genossenschaft (eG), a registered cooperative society under German law
 e.g., abbreviation for exempli gratia, a Latin phrase meaning "for example"

See also 
 Egg (disambiguation)